Lago di Sartirana is a lake in the Province of Lecco, Lombardy, Italy. Its surface area is 0.098 km².

Lakes of Lombardy